U.C. Sampdoria had a successful season in the domestic league, finishing in sixth place. The club also captured Antonio Cassano from Real Madrid, with the notorious troublemaker settling in well at Sampdoria, helping the club to European qualification. The season also saw the first Serie A derbies between Sampdoria and Genoa C.F.C. since 1995, with Sampdoria winning the second one with 1-0, following a goalless draw in the beginning of the league campaign.

First-team squad

Goalkeepers
  Luca Castellazzi
  Antonio Mirante
  Vincenzo Fiorillo

Defenders
  Pietro Accardi
  Stefano Lucchini
  Luigi Sala
  Hugo Campagnaro
  Daniele Gastaldello
  Leonardo Migliónico
  Mirko Pieri
  Christian Maggio

Midfielders
  Reto Ziegler
  Sergio Volpi
  Cristian Zenoni
  Andrea Poli
  Angelo Palombo
  Vladimir Koman
  Daniele Franceschini
  Paolo Sammarco
  Nikola Gulan
  Gennaro Delvecchio

Attackers
  Vincenzo Montella
  Claudio Bellucci
  Antonio Cassano
  Andrea Caracciolo
  Emiliano Bonazzoli
  Gabriel Ferrari
  Ikechukwu Kalu

Results

Serie A

 Siena-Sampdoria 1-2
 0-1 Claudio Bellucci (34)
 1-1 Daniele Corvia (68)
 1-2 Vincenzo Montella (87)
 Sampdoria-Lazio 0-0
 Napoli-Sampdoria 2-0
 1-0 Marcelo Zalayeta (43)
 2-0 Marek Hamšík (77)
 Sampdoria-Genoa 0-0
 Inter-Sampdoria 3-0
 1-0 Zlatan Ibrahimović (23)
 2-0 Zlatan Ibrahimović (49)
 3-0 Luís Figo (58)
 Sampdoria-Atalanta 3-0
 1-0 Claudio Bellucci (3)
 2-0 Paolo Sammarco (56)
 3-0 Antonio Cassano (82)
 Torino-Sampdoria 1-0
 1-0 Eugenio Corini (88)
 Sampdoria-Parma 3-0
 1-0 Vincenzo Montella (25)
 2-0 Claudio Bellucci (47)
 3-0 Claudio Bellucci (58)
 Catania-Sampdoria 2-0
 1-0 Giuseppe Mascara (2)
 2-0 Jorge Martínez (42)
 Sampdoria-Milan 0-5
 0-1 Kaká (47 pen)
 0-2 Alberto Gilardino (53)
 0-3 Alberto Gilardino (61)
 0-4 Yoann Gourcuff (75)
 0-5 Clarence Seedorf (80)
 Cagliari-Sampdoria 0-3
 0-1 Sergio Volpi (33)
 0-2 Andrea Caracciolo (39)
 0-3 Christian Maggio (45)
 Sampdoria-Empoli 3-0
 1-0 Guillermo Giacomazzi (5 og)
 2-0 Vincenzo Montella (40)
 3-0 Paolo Sammarco (90)
 Livorno-Sampdoria 3-1
 1-0 Dario Knežević (7)
 2-0 Francesco Tavano (10)
 2-1 Claudio Bellucci (80)
 3-1 Francesco Tavano (89)
 Sampdoria-Reggina 3-0
 1-0 Claudio Bellucci (4)
 2-0 Paolo Sammarco (55)
 3-0 Claudio Bellucci (76)
 Udinese-Sampdoria 3-2
 1-0 Antonio Di Natale (24)
 1-1 Claudio Bellucci (32 pen)
 1-2 Christian Maggio (40)
 2-2 Fabio Quagliarella (70)
 3-2 Fabio Quagliarella (87)
 Sampdoria-Fiorentina 2-2
 1-0 Daniele Gastaldello (18)
 1-1 Adrian Mutu (38)
 1-2 Marco Donadel (57)
 2-2 Antonio Cassano (69)
 Roma-Sampdoria 2-0
 1-0 Francesco Totti (18 pen)
 2-0 Francesco Totti (90)
 Sampdoria-Palermo 3-0
 1-0 Claudio Bellucci (20)
 2-0 Paolo Sammarco (45)
 3-0 Antonio Cassano (77)
 Juventus-Sampdoria 0-0
 Sampdoria-Siena 1-0
 1-0 Antonio Cassano (44)
 Lazio-Sampdoria 2-1
 1-0 Stefano Mauri (37)
 1-1 Antonio Cassano (45 + 1)
 2-1 Tommaso Rocchi (77)
 Sampdoria-Napoli 2-0
 1-0 Gennaro Delvecchio (76)
 2-0 Daniele Franceschini (82)
 Genoa-Sampdoria 0-1
 0-1 Christian Maggio (88)
 Sampdoria-Inter 1-1
 1-0 Antonio Cassano (65)
 1-1 Hernán Crespo (76)
 Atalanta-Sampdoria 4-1
 0-1 Sergio Volpi (3)
 1-1 Cristiano Doni (13)
 2-1 Cristiano Doni (33)
 3-1 Sergio Floccari (36)
 4-1 Daniele Capelli (52)
 Sampdoria-Torino 2-2
 0-1 Gianluca Comotto (18)
 1-1 Luigi Sala (45)
 1-2 David Di Michele (50 pen)
 2-2 Antonio Cassano (52)
 Parma-Sampdoria 1-2
 0-1 Christian Maggio (12)
 0-2 Emiliano Bonazzoli (57)
 1-2 Igor Budan (67)
 Sampdoria-Catania 3-1
 1-0 Angelo Palombo (68)
 1-1 Lorenzo Stovini (73)
 2-1 Pietro Accardi (76)
 3-1 Claudio Bellucci (86)
 Milan-Sampdoria 1-2
 0-1 Christian Maggio (12)
 0-2 Gennaro Delvecchio (25)
 1-2 Alberto Paloschi (71)
 Sampdoria-Cagliari 1-1
 0-1 Pasquale Foggia (41)
 1-1 Daniele Franceschini (90)
 Empoli-Sampdoria 0-2
 0-1 Paolo Sammarco (6)
 0-2 Lino Marzoratti (16 og)
 Sampdoria-Livorno 2-0
 1-0 Christian Maggio (66)
 2-0 Emiliano Bonazzoli (84)
 Reggina-Sampdoria 1-0
 1-0 Franco Brienza (35)
 Sampdoria-Udinese 3-0
 1-0 Antonio Cassano (24)
 2-0 Claudio Bellucci (44)
 3-0 Claudio Bellucci (52 pen)
 Fiorentina-Sampdoria 2-2
 0-1 Christian Maggio (63)
 1-1 Christian Vieri (78)
 2-1 Adrian Mutu (84)
 2-2 Daniele Gastaldello (90 + 4)
 Sampdoria-Roma 0-3
 0-1 Christian Panucci (72)
 0-2 David Pizarro (76)
 0-3 Cicinho (82)
 Palermo-Sampdoria 0-2
 0-1 Antonio Cassano (61)
 0-2 Christian Maggio (76)
 Sampdoria-Juventus 3-3
 0-1 Alessandro Del Piero (6)
 0-2 David Trezeguet (15 pen)
 1-2 Antonio Cassano (21)
 2-2 Christian Maggio (40)
 2-3 Alessandro Del Piero (65 pen)
 3-3 Vincenzo Montella (80)

Statistics

Top scorers

Serie A
  Claudio Bellucci 12
  Antonio Cassano 10
  Christian Maggio 8
  Vincenzo Montella 4

References

Sources
RSSSF - Italy 2007/08

U.C. Sampdoria seasons
Sampdoria